Thierry Santa (born 29 August 1967) is a French politician in New Caledonia who served the 9th President of the Government of New Caledonia, elected by the cabinet on 6 July 2019. He left office on 22 July 2021. Santa is the leader of The Rally political party since 2018. He previously served as President of the Congress of New Caledonia from 2015 to 2018 and secretary general of The Rally from 2013 to 2016.

Santa was born in Papeete, Tahiti, French Polynesia and studied economic science at the University of Bordeaux I in Bordeaux, France.

Personal life

Santa married Sabine Di Russo (born 1 February 1974) on 3 September 2010, the Human Resources Director of the company Nouméa Casinos.

References

1967 births
People from Papeete
New Caledonia politicians
Presidents of the Government of New Caledonia
Living people
Presidents of the Congress of New Caledonia
The Rally (New Caledonia) politicians
University of Bordeaux alumni